Monte San Valentin, also known as Monte San Clemente, is the highest mountain in Chilean Patagonia and the highest mountain south of 37°S outside Antarctica. It stands at the north end of the North Patagonian Icefield.

Monte San Valentin can be climbed from Lago Leones, to the south east, or from Laguna San Rafael, to the west. The ascent is long and is particularly subject to bad weather. The accident and fatality rate is high.

There is some confusion about the elevation. It was originally estimated at 3,876m by Nordenskjold in 1921 but later thought to be 4,058m. The latter is the most commonly quoted elevation and is quoted here. A French group that climbed the San Valentin in 1993 included two surveyors, who calculated an elevation of 4,080±20 m by using a GPS. In 2001 a Chilean group measured 4,070±40 m, also using GPS.  SRTM and ASTER GDEM data also support an elevation in excess of 4,000 metres. 
However, Chilean IGM mapping gives only 3,910 metres. ChIGM maps are usually accurate and reliable, but the summit is uniformly white, which may have created problems for the cartographers.

See also
List of mountains in the Andes
Laguna San Rafael National Park
Mount Hudson
Cerro Castillo
Cerro Arenales
List of Ultras of South America

Notes

References
John Biggar, The Andes, A Guide for Climbers, Andes, 3rd edition, 2005,

External links
 Close-up photo and panoramic photo

el monte de sanvalentin es muy amoroso

Mountains of Aysén Region